HCS may refer to:

Education 
 Hackensack Christian School, in New Jersey, United States
 Hallett Cove School, in Adelaide, South Australia
 Hampshire Country School, in New Hampshire, United States
 Hampton Christian Schools, in Virginia, United States
 Hardin County Schools, in Kentucky, United States
 Harrisburg Christian School, in Pennsylvania, United States
 Hereford Cathedral School, in England
 Heritage Christian School (disambiguation)
 Heritage College Sydney, in New South Wales, Australia
 Highland Catholic School, in Minnesota, United States
 Hilltop Christian School, in North Carolina, United States
 Hinsdale Central School, in New York, United States
 Hooghly Collegiate School, in West Bengal, India
 Holland Christian Schools, in Michigan, United States
 Holy Cross School (disambiguation)
 Horry County Schools, in South Carolina, United States
 Hull Collegiate School, in England

Biology and medicine 
 Hajdu–Cheney syndrome
 High-content screening
 Human chorionic somatomammotropin
 Hydrocortisone

Science and mathematics 
 HCS clustering algorithm
 Heliospheric current sheet
 Hierarchical constraint satisfaction
 Hummocky cross-stratification

Technology 
 Hard-clad silica optical fiber
 Header check sequence
 Hierarchical cell structure (telecommunications)
 Hub-center steering

Other uses 
 Halifax Choral Society
 Halo Championship Series
 Harlem Children Society
 High Council of State (disambiguation)
 The Histochemical Society
 Hollywood Center Studios
 Honoris Crux Silver, a military decoration of South Africa
 Honourable Company's Service or Honourable Company's Ship, used to prefix the names of East India Company ships
 HUMINT Control System, an aspect of the Sensitive compartmented information protocol
 Hyderabad Civil Service, India